Spain women's national softball team is the national team for Spain. The team competed at the 1994 ISF Women's World Championship in St. John's, Newfoundland where they finished twentieth.

References

External links 
 International Softball Federation

Softball
Women's national softball teams
Softball in Spain